Leonora Jiménez Monge (born 1983 in Santa Ana, Costa Rica) is a Costa Rican beauty pageant titleholder and the original winner of 2005 Miss Asia Pacific International. She was dethroned because of her participation in Miss World 2005 and the Miss Asia Pacific title was passed to the 1st runner up, Evgeniya Lapova of Russia. Leonora did not place among the semifinalists in Miss World.

 During 2007 she began making promos for the product she created, Vita Fitness, as well as a TV show called Vita Fitness: El Desafío (Vita Fitness: The Challenge). It featured one group of people exercising and another group taking Vita Fitness pills so they could show that Vita Fitness did work.  She also appeared in a promo campaign for the product "Veet", and in 2008 she released the second cycle for the Latin American version for America's Next Top Model, Supermodel Centroamérica. She has done photo shoots for Loeve and Chanel. Has Mia posed for the magazine, Elle and Telva.
 She was a presenter at the 2011 of Miss Costa Rica the same year.
 She has worked with major national (of Costa Rica) brands and designers and international as Matilde Cano, Custo Barcelona, Dior, On Aura Tout Vu, Tiffi, Dolce & Gabbana suramerica, accessories Lavin, Guishem, Daniel Moreira, Marcelle Desanti, MNG, Guayaberi, among others.
 In 2013 along with her brother Andrés Jiménez Monge, a wildlife biologist and activist, she spearheaded the campaign "Salvemos Nuestros Mares" that successfully lead to the banning of shrimp trawling in Costa Rica and the acknowledgement by President Laura Chinchilla on the need to refurbish Costa Rican fisheries. Organizations like Marviva, Pretoma, Fecop, The Leatherbacktrust, International Student Volunteers, UESPRA and Widecast formed the coalition called "Frente por Nuestros Mares" to advocate for the change in fisheries policies in the country.

Personal life
 She married John Henry in April 2008.
 She practices karate.
 She has her own beauty salon called Allure opened in 2013.
 She owns the store Tiffi.
 In addition to her business ventures, Leonora invests time in social causes and ecological wellness.

Magazine covers

Leonora posed for the magazine SEXIEST WOMEN

She poses for the magazine Perfil(journal of Costa Rica) in 2008.

She poses for Soho magazine (magazine of Costa Rica) in 2011. SoHo Costa Rica celebrated its fifth anniversary with a deluxe edition which 
invited to participate to Leonora Jimenez, the model of the most prominent country in the European catwalks. The tica posed for photographers in five different scenarios: Madrid, Spain, Paris, France, Milan, Italy, Poznan, Poland, and Puerto Viejo, Costa Rica.

She has her own fashion magazine called Traffic in 2013, being the editor and project manager.

Special Awards in Miss Asia Pacific International 2005 
 Best in National Costume
 Best in Swimsuit

Television & promos 
 Super Model Centroamérica (2007)
 Vita Fitness (Product Promo Announce) (Aired During2007/2008)
 Vita Fitness: Vita Desafío (Promo TV Show For Vita Fitness) (2007)
 Veet Promo Announce (Aired During 2007/2008)
 Super Model Centroamérica, Cycle 2 (2008)
 Presenter Miss Costa Rica 2011.
 Promotes reading by announcing (I invite you to read with me) shown on Channel 13 (of Costa Rica) in 2013
 Participate in an add against child labor, along with presenter Patricia Figueroa, Natalia Carvajal and other public figures to Costa Rica
 She has given interviews to Intrusos de la Farandula (channel 11, Repretel-Costa Rica), 7 Estrellas (channel 7, Teletica-Costa Rica), Buen dia (channel 7, Teletica-Costa Rica), RG Elementos (channel 7, Teletica-Costa Rica), Channel 13 (channel 13, Sinart-Costa Rica).
 She has been the face of a publicity campaign against driving under the influence of alcohol, with the phrase " Si tomas, no manejes".

Runway 

Paris fashion week 2012
 She has worked as a runway model for On Aura Tout vu. She opened and closed the show.

Costa Rica

 She has walked in the catwalk for MNG 2006.
 She Organized the fashion week in San Jose (Costa Rica) and models, in 2013, presented by Mercedes-Benz
 She modeled in many fashion shows of the UCreativa (Creative University of Costa Rica)

España
 She has modeled for the popular Pasarela Gaudi in Barcelona.

Support for the rights of diversity

 Leonora in the march pro-diversity in Costa Rica 2013.

References 

https://web.archive.org/web/20130925233218/http://www.revistasoho.co.cr/contenido/articles/1446/1/Leonora-Jimenez/Paacuteginas1.html

Miss World 2005 delegates
Costa Rican beauty pageant winners
1983 births
Living people
People from San José Province